Damian Zbozień (born 25 April 1989) is a Polish professional footballer who plays as a right-back for Górnik Łęczna. Besides Poland, he has played in Russia.

Club career
Born in Limanowa, Zbozień began his career as a youth player for Zyndram Łącko. Then he played for two years in Sandecja Nowy Sącz youth teams.

In 2007 Zbozień joined Legia Warsaw and on 30 July 2007 he made his Młoda Ekstraklasa debut in a 3–1 loss to Cracovia. Three months later, on 4 December 2007 he made his debut for Legia first team in a 2–0 victory over ŁKS Łódź in Ekstraklasa Cup. On 7 April 2008 Zbozień scored his first goal in a 2–1 victory over GKS Bełchatów in Młoda Ekstraklasa. He ended the 2007–08 season with 27 appearances in that competition and one in Ekstraklasa Cup.

On 27 August 2008 Zbozień played for Legia reserves in a 0–3 loss to Motor Lublin and he ended the 2008–09 season with 28 appearances and four goals in Młoda Ekstraklasa. He also appeared in one match in Ekstraklasa Cup.

In March 2010, he moved to Sandecja Nowy Sącz.

In February 2014 he joined the Russian side FC Amkar Perm, where he met the fellow countryman Janusz Gol. However, Zbozień only played six league games before being loaned to GKS Bełchatów.

Quickly returning to the Ekstraklasa with Zagłębie Lubin in 2015 and Arka Gdynia, Zbozień won the Polish Cup with Arka in 2017, remaining on the bench throughout as Arka beat Lech Poznan 2-1 at the National Stadium, Warsaw. 

When Arka were relegated in 2020 during a season interrupted by the COVID-19 pandemic in Poland, Zbozień joined one of the clubs that finished just above the relegation zone, Wisła Płock. 

On 5 August 2022, he left Wisła to join I liga side Górnik Łęczna on a two-year contract.

Honours

Club
Arka Gdynia
 Polish Cup: 2016–17
 Polish Super Cup: 2017, 2018

References

External links
 
 

1989 births
Living people
People from Limanowa
Sportspeople from Lesser Poland Voivodeship
Polish footballers
Poland under-21 international footballers
Association football defenders
Association football midfielders
Legia Warsaw players
Sandecja Nowy Sącz players
GKS Bełchatów players
Piast Gliwice players
Zagłębie Lubin players
Arka Gdynia players
FC Amkar Perm players
Wisła Płock players
Górnik Łęczna players
Ekstraklasa players
I liga players
Russian Premier League players
Expatriate footballers in Russia
Polish expatriate sportspeople in Russia